Philippi was an ancient town in Macedonia, Greece, near the municipality of Filippoi.

Philippi may also refer to:

Places
Caesarea Philippi, an ancient Roman town in the Golan Heights
Philippi (Caria), an ancient town in Caria, now in Turkey
Philippi, West Virginia, a city in the United States
Philippi, Cape Town, South Africa, one of the larger and newest of the Cape's townships

Battles of Philippi 
Battle of Philippi (42 BC), a Roman Civil War battle
Battle of Philippi (West Virginia) (1861), an American Civil War battle

Other 
Philippi (surname)
Philippi (Rome) an episode from the HBO TV series Rome
The Philippi Collection, private collection of religious headgear

See also 
 Filippi